The Book of Opposites (2010) is a novel by John David Morley, a love story set in Berlin in the aftermath of the fall of the Wall.

Summary 

Beginning with a Mercedes 600 plunging off the Glienicker Bridge between the former borders of East and West, The Book of Opposites is a tale of love, death, precognition, paradox, yoga and quantum mechanics.

Reception 

“This is a bold and fascinating mystery novel of ideas”, said Ian McEwan of the book in advance of its publication. "John David Morley enfolds science and human loss with great fictional cunning."

References 

2010 British novels
British mystery novels
British philosophical novels
Novels set in Berlin
Novels by John David Morley